Bonaventure is a town on the Gaspé Peninsula in the Bonaventure Regional County Municipality of Quebec. It is located on Baie des Chaleurs near the mouth of the Bonaventure River. The town is situated on Route 132 between Saint-Siméon and New Carlisle.

The Quebec Acadian Museum (Musée Acadien du Québec) is located in the town.

The town was named after the Italian saint Bonaventure.

History

The first permanent European settlement of Bonaventure was in 1760 by Acadian refugees who had successfully avoided the expulsion of Acadians that had begun in 1755.  Some of these early settlers were present at the Battle of Restigouche in July 1760, where a mixed force of French navy aided by Acadians were defeated by the Royal Navy.  Many of today's Bonaventure residents are of Acadian descent.

Prior to permanent settlement, the Bonaventure harbour had often been visited by Europeans and was the location of temporary camps and posts for many years before.

At the time of settlement, Bonaventure was located in lands possessed by France, but in 1763, after the Treaty of Paris, all of New France was ceded to Britain, and Bonaventure became part of British colony of the Province of Quebec.  Later, some of the lands already settled by the Acadians were granted to anglophones, although after decades of petitioning the Quebéc government, some of the Acadian settlers were able to gain title to the lands they occupied.  However, even as late as 1891, more than half of the homesteaders in this region had no legal title to the lands they lived on.

Bonaventure was raided by Americans during the War of Independence.

Demographics 

Mother tongue language (2011)

See also
 List of cities in Quebec

References

External links
 Town site

Cities and towns in Quebec
Incorporated places in Gaspésie–Îles-de-la-Madeleine